Schenck-Mann House is a historic home located at Syosset in Nassau County, New York.  It is a -story, five-bay-wide timber-framed residence with a wood shingle gable roof and rectangular plan.  The western three bays were built about 1700.  The house was extensively renovated during the 1940s after a period of abandonment.

It was listed on the National Register of Historic Places in 2005.

References

Houses on the National Register of Historic Places in New York (state)
Houses in Nassau County, New York
National Register of Historic Places in Nassau County, New York